Heads is the fifth album by jazz musician Bob James, released in October 1977. It was his first album released on his newly formed Tappan Zee label, which was distributed at the time by Columbia Records. All of his Tappan Zee albums (which includes his CTI back-catalog) are now distributed by E1 Music. The album reached number one on the Billboard Jazz Albums chart.

Track listing
"Heads" (Bob James) – 6:40
"We're All Alone" (Boz Scaggs) – 5:33
"I'm in You" (Peter Frampton) – 6:48
"Night Crawler" (Bob James) – 6:20
"You Are So Beautiful" (Billy Preston, Bruce Fisher) – 6:48
"One Loving Night" (Henry Purcell) – 5:48

Personnel 
 Bob James – arrangements, acoustic piano (1, 2, 5, 6), Fender Rhodes (1-4), clavinet (1, 3), Oberheim Polyphonic synthesizer (1-4), synth bells (1), ARP Odyssey (3), harpsichord (6)
 Ed Walsh – synthesizer programming (1-6)
 Richard Tee – rhythm keyboards (2)
 Steve Khan – guitar (1, 2, 4, 6)
 Eric Gale – guitar (1, 2, 5, 6) electric guitar (4), guitar solo (5)
 Jeff Layton – guitar (3)
 Jeff Mironov – guitar (3)
 Alphonso Johnson – bass (1, 2)
 Will Lee – bass (3)
 Gary King – bass (4, 5, 6)
 Steve Gadd – drums (1, 2)
 Allan Schwartzberg – drums (3)
 Andy Newmark – drums (4, 5, 6)
 Ralph MacDonald – percussion (1-6)
 Mike Mainieri – vibraphone (2)

Brass and Woodwinds
 Michael Brecker – soprano saxophone, tenor saxophone 
 Phil Bodner – alto saxophone, bass clarinet, flute, oboe
 Eddie Daniels – tenor saxophone, clarinet, flute
 George Marge – baritone saxophone, flute, English horn, oboe, sopranino recorder (6)
 Gerry Niewood – alto saxophone, tenor saxophone, alto flute 
 David Sanborn – alto saxophone, alto sax solo (3, 4, 6)
 Grover Washington Jr. – tenor sax solo (6)
 Wayne Andre – trombone
 Tom Mitchell Jr. – trombone
 Dave Taylor – trombone
 Randy Brecker – flugelhorn, trumpet
 Jon Faddis – flugelhorn, trumpet
 John Frosk – flugelhorn, trumpet
 Lew Soloff – flugelhorn, trumpet
 Marvin Stamm – flugelhorn, trumpet
 James Buffington – French horn
 Peter Gordon – French horn
 Brooks Tillotson – French horn

Strings
 Jonathan Abramowitz – cello
 Charles McCracken – cello
 Alan Shulman – cello
 Gloria Agostini – harp
 Lamar Alsop – viola
 Al Brown – viola
 Emanuel Vardi – viola
 Harry Cykman – violin
 Max Ellen – violin
 Barry Finclair – violin
 Paul Gershman – violin
 Diana Halprin – violin
 Harold Kohon – violin
 Marvin Morgenstern – violin
 David Nadien – violin, concertmaster
 John Pintavalle – violin
 Max Pollikoff – violin
 Matthew Raimondi – violin

Vocals on "You Are So Beautiful"
 Patti Austin
 Vivian Cherry
 Lani Groves
 Gwen Guthrie

Production 
 Bob James – producer 
 Joe Jorgensen – associate producer, engineer, mixing
 Jay Borden – assistant engineer
 Michael Braver – assistant engineer
 Doug Epstein – assistant engineer
 John Berg – art direction, design 
 Paula Scher – art direction, design 
 Buddy Endress – photography

Charts

References

External links
 Bob James-Heads at Discogs

1977 albums
Bob James (musician) albums
Albums produced by Bob James (musician)